Mongolian Khan (foaled 19 October 2011) is a retired Australian-bred New Zealand-trained Thoroughbred racehorse. In 2015 he won the 140th running of the New Zealand Derby before going on to win the Australian Derby becoming the first horse to complete the double in 29 years. As a four-year-old he won the Caulfield Cup.

Background
Mongolian Khan was foaled at Graeme McCulloch's Grenville stud at Whitemore in Northern Tasmania, Australia, in October 2011. He is a half-brother to Wellington Cup winner Young Centaur, which is why McCulloch decided to sell him in New Zealand in partnership with Ainsley Downs Stud. He was brought to New Zealand by Courtney Howells of Ainsley Downs Stud (Waikato, New Zealand) as a weanling and prepared for the Karaka yearling sales, where he was on sold for $140 000.

Racing career

2014/15: three-year-old season
Mongolian Khan won on debut at Te Rapa at odds greater than 40 to one, but failed in the Group Two Hawke's Bay Guineas in his second career start. Once he stepped up over a mile and beyond he proved a revelation, winning five in a row including the 3yo Salver, Waikato Guineas, Avondale Guineas and New Zealand Derby.

The New Zealand Derby was billed as a match race with Volkstok'n'barrell, who had created a big impression of his own in winning five races in a row including the Bonecrusher Stakes, Great Northern Guineas and Karaka Mile. The eagerly anticipated clash lived up to expectations as the two exciting three-year-olds drew well clear of their rivals and fought a memorable struggle down the home straight. Having been clearly headed by Volkstok'n'barrell, Mongolian Khan fought back and proved too strong in the concluding stages, edging away to win by one length. There was a margin of more than five lengths back to the remainder of the field.

Mongolian Khan then travelled to Australia, where he finished a disappointing fifth in the Rosehill Guineas. He bounced back impressively from that, however, winning the Australian Derby strongly from Hauraki and his arch-rival Volkstok'n'barrell. In doing so he became the first horse to win the New Zealand Derby-Australian Derby double since Bonecrusher in 1986.

2015/16: four-year-old season
Mongolian Khan began his four-year-old season by finishing seventh to Fawkner in the Makybe Diva Stakes at Flemington Racecourse on 12 September and then ran fourth to Mourinho in the Underwood Stakes at Caulfield two weeks later. At the same track on 10 October the colt finished third in the Caulfield Stakes behind Criterion and Happy Trails. On 17 October, Mongolian Khan started the 4/1 favourite in an eighteen-runner field for the Caulfield Cup. He took the lead 400 metres from the finish and won by half a length from the British challenger Trip To Paris.

Pedigree

See also

 2015 New Zealand Derby
 Thoroughbred racing in New Zealand

References 

Racehorses bred in Australia
Racehorses trained in Australia
2011 racehorse births
Thoroughbred family 10-d
Caulfield Cup winners